The Bukhara operation (1920), was a military conflict fought between the Russian Soviet Federative Socialist Republic and the Young Bukharians against the Emirate of Bukhara. The war lasted between 28 August and 2 September 1920, ending in the defeat of the Bukhara Emirate, which was instead replaced by the RSFSR-controlled Bukharan People's Soviet Republic.

Background

The Emirate of Bukhara was officially created in 1785, upon the assumption of throne by the Manghit emir, Shah Murad. Over the course of the 18th century, the emirs had slowly gained effective control of the Khanate of Bukhara from their position as ataliq. In 1868 the emirate was conquered by Imperial Russia, which had colonial aspirations in the region. Russia annexed much of the emirate's territory, including the important city of Samarkand.

The Russian Civil War erupted on 7 November 1917, pitting the Bolshevik-led Red Army against the White Army. During the first two years of the conflict, communist troops failed to make considerable progress in the Central Asian theaters, as the majority of Red Army forces were tied down on other fronts. In spring 1918, a group of British intelligence agents visited Tashkent in an effort to identify what was happening in the region, due to poor British intelligence. The mission was headed by British officer Frederick Marshman Bailey, who subsequently went on to evade Bolshevik capture for several months until he escaped.

The defeat of the White Army troops led by Alexander Kolchak during the second half of 1919 radically changed the situation on the Turkestani theater of the war. The Red Turkestan Front was formed on 14 August 1919, as the communists began relocating their forces by means of the Central Asian railroad network that had remained intact since the beginning of the war. The emir of Bukhara became aware of the communist maneuvers, enacting mobilization, which brought Bukhara's army to a total of 35,000 soldiers, 15 machine guns and 55 small cannons. A surge in the activities of the leftist Young Bukharians movement in August 1920 prompted Red Army commander Mikhail Frunze to act in their support.

Conflict
Οn the night 28 August 1920, Young Bukharians launched a revolt in Türkmenabat, subjugating the city. At the same time the Red Army launched an offensive on Qorako'l, approaching it from the south-west. On 30 August, communist troops began bombarding the Karshin gates in Bukhara, in preparation of an upcoming assault. Soviet forces then attacked the bridges over the Burdalik, Nardalik and Amu Darya rivers, securing them on 31 August. On 2 September, communist forces penetrated the gates and overtook Bukhara. Emir Mohammed Alim Khan had however already fled to the eastern part of the state with a group of 1,000 soldiers.
Alim Khan's defeat enabled the revolutionaries to establish the RSFSR-controlled Bukharan PSR.

Notes

References

Further reading 
 Paksoy, H. B.: Basmachi Movement From Within: Account of Zeki Velidi Togan, in: Nationalities Papers, 1995, Vol. 23, No. 2, pp. 373–399. Russian translation: Заки Валиди Тоган о басмаческом движении.

See also
 Soviet Central Asia

Bukharan People's Soviet Republic
Battles of the Russian Civil War
Emirate of Bukhara
1920 in Russia
Conflicts in 1920
1920 in Asia
History of Bukhara
Military history of Uzbekistan